In mathematics, an order in the sense of ring theory is a subring  of a ring , such that

 is a finite-dimensional algebra over the field  of rational numbers

When  is not a commutative ring, the idea of order is still important, but the phenomena are different. For example, the Hurwitz quaternions form a maximal order in the quaternions with rational co-ordinates; they are not the quaternions with integer coordinates in the most obvious sense. Maximal orders exist in general, but need not be unique: there is in general no largest order, but a number of maximal orders. An important class of examples is that of integral group rings.

Examples
Some examples of orders are:
 If  is the group ring  of a finite group , then  is an -order on 

However this hypothesis is not always satisfied: indeed  need not even be a ring, and even if  is a ring (for example, when  is commutative) then  need not be an -lattice.

Algebraic number theory
In algebraic number theory there are examples for any  other than the rational field of proper subrings of the ring of integers that are also orders.

The maximal order question can be examined at a local field level. This technique is applied in algebraic number theory and modular representation theory.

See also 
 Hurwitz quaternion order – An example of ring order

Notes

References
 
 

Ring theory